Leezen is an Amt ("collective municipality") in the district of Segeberg, in Schleswig-Holstein, Germany. The seat of the Amt is in Leezen.

The Amt Leezen consists of the following municipalities:

Bark 
Bebensee 
Fredesdorf 
Groß Niendorf 
Högersdorf 
Kükels 
Leezen
Mözen 
Neversdorf 
Schwissel 
Todesfelde 
Wittenborn

Ämter in Schleswig-Holstein
Segeberg